Therma may refer to:

Thermi, the modern municipality near Thessaloniki, Greece
Therma (Icaria), the ancient town of Icaria
Termini Imerese, the ancient city in Sicily
Therma, Samothrace, a village in Greece
Thermae, Roman baths